Cellanus (fl. ca. 675-706) was the abbot of Péronne in Picardy. At the time, Péronne was known as Perrona Scottorum on account of its fame as a home to Irish peregrini.

He was a penfriend and correspondent of Aldhelm, and it is from a surviving letter that much of our knowledge of Cellanus originates. Ludwig Traube believed him to be identical with the Abbot Cellanus whose obit is recorded in the Annales Laureshamenses under 706; and was probably the Cellan mac Sechnusaigh, sapiens, recorded in the same year in the Annals of Ulster (pp. 96–119, 1900). Traube furthermore attributed two hexameter poems to Cellanus (Traube, pp. 105–08, 1900).

Panegyric to Saint Patrick

Cellanus was thought to have been the composer of a panegyric in honour of Saint Patrick after the manner of Virgil, which was inscribed on the walls of a basilica at Peronne which was dedicated to Patrick. However, Lapidge (1994 pp 110–15,) attributes this to Abbot Boniface. Against this, Hoffmann (2001 p 17) and Howlett (1998 p 38), think the poem is probably Hiberno-Latin. On this subject, Charles D. Wright states:

References

 O Roma nobilis. Philologische Untersuchungen aus dem Mittelalter, Ludwig Traube, pp. 399–395, Abhandlungen der königlichen bayerische Akademie der Wissenschaften, Klasse 19, 1894.
 Perrona Scottorum, ein Beitrag zur Überlieferungsgeschichte und zur Palaeographie des Mittelalters, pp. 469–538, Vorlesungen und Abhandlungen, ed. Franz Boll, Paul Lehmann, and Samuel Brandt, München 1900 (1901, 1920).
 Autographs of Insular Latin Authors of the Early Middle Ages, pp. 103–36, Michael Lapidge, in Gli autografi medievali. Problemi paleografici e filologici. Atti del convegno di studio della Fondazione Ezio Franceschini. Erice, 25 settembre–2 ottobre 1990, ed. Paolo Chiesa and Lucia Pinelli, 1994.
 Insular Acrostics, Celtic Latin Colophons, pp. 27–44, David Howlett, Cambrian Medieval Celtic Studies 35, 1998.
 Autographa des früheren Mittelalters.”, pp.1-62, Hartmut Hoffmann, Deutsches Archiv für Erforschung des Mittelalters 17, 2001.
 Hiberno-Latin Literature to 1169, Dáibhí Ó Cróinín, chapter XI, A New History of Ireland'', volume I, 2005.

External links
 Charles D. Wright - https://web.archive.org/web/20120326130829/http://saslc.nd.edu/samples/c/cellanus_of_peronne.pdf
 https://web.archive.org/web/20110204000857/http://www.mun.ca/mst/heroicage/issues/4/Grimmer.html

7th-century Irish poets
7th-century Irish writers
7th-century Irish abbots
Irish expatriates in France
Irish Latinists
7th-century Latin writers